Hugh Courtenay or Hugh de Courtenay is the name of:

Family of Earls of Devon of Tiverton
 Hugh de Courtenay (1251–1292), son and heir of John de Courtenay, feudal baron of Okehampton, Devon, by Isabel de Vere, daughter of Hugh de Vere, 4th Earl of Oxford. His son inherited the earldom of Devon
 Hugh de Courtenay, 1st/9th Earl of Devon (1276–1340), of Tiverton Castle, son of Hugh de Courtenay (1251–1292)
 Hugh de Courtenay, 2nd/10th Earl of Devon (1303–1377), 2nd Baron Courtenay, feudal baron of Okehampton and feudal baron of Plympton, played an important role in the Hundred Years' War in the service of King Edward III. His chief seats were Tiverton Castle and Okehampton in Devon
 Sir Hugh Courtenay (died 1348) (1327–1348), KG, English knight, eldest son and heir apparent of Hugh de Courtenay, 2nd/10th Earl of Devon (1303–1377)
Hugh Courtenay (died 1374), English soldier, son of Sir Hugh Courtenay (KG) (1327–1348) and grandson and heir apparent of Hugh de Courtenay, 2nd/10th Earl of Devon (1303–1377).
 Sir Hugh Courtenay (died 1425) (1358–1425) of Haccombe, grandson of Hugh Courtenay, 2nd/10th Earl of Devon and grandfather of Edward Courtenay, 1st Earl of Devon (d.1509), was an English member of Parliament and High Sheriff of Devon
 Hugh de Courtenay, 4th/12th Earl of Devon (1389–1422), English nobleman, of Tiverton Castle, son of the 3rd/11th Earl of Devon, and father of the 5th/13th Earl
 Sir Hugh Courtenay (d.1471) of Boconnoc (1420s–1471), Cornwall, MP, son of Sir Hugh Courtenay (died 1425) (1358–1425) of Haccombe and father of Edward Courtenay, 1st Earl of Devon (d.1509)

Earls of Devon of Powderham
 Hugh Courtenay, 18th Earl of Devon (1942–2015), of Powderham, British peer, descended from Hugh de Courtenay, 2nd/10th Earl of Devon (1303–1377) of Tiverton

Other
 Hugh Courtenay (MP), Welsh politician who sat in the House of Commons in 1653